Lakeview Terrace is a 2008 American crime thriller film directed by Neil LaBute, written by David Loughery and Howard Korder, co-produced by James Lassiter and Will Smith, and starring Samuel L. Jackson, Patrick Wilson and Kerry Washington. Jackson plays a racist African-American LAPD police officer who terrorizes his new next-door neighbors (Wilson and Washington) because they are an interracially married couple. The title is a reference to the ethnically mixed middle class Los Angeles neighborhood of Lake View Terrace.

The film was released on September 19, 2008, received mixed reviews and grossed $44 million.

Plot
A newlywed interracial couple, Chris and Lisa Mattson, are moving into their first home. Chris's first exchanges with their neighbor, widowed and longtime LAPD police officer and African-American man Abel Turner, have somewhat hostile undertones, with Abel making comments about Chris' smoking (which Abel later exposes to Lisa) and listening to hip hop music, and making remarks about his race in his relationship with Lisa. The following night, Chris and Lisa have sex in their swimming pool. Unbeknownst to them, Abel's children, Marcus and Celia, are watching them. Abel arrives home and witnesses the spectacle. Angered, he repositions his house security floodlights to shine into Chris and Lisa's bedroom window, keeping them awake.

Abel begins to insinuate to Chris that he disapproves of his marriage and that he wants them to move out of their new neighborhood. One evening, Chris and Lisa hear noises downstairs and find the tires on Chris' car slashed. Suspecting Abel, they call the police, who are unable to do anything because of Abel's status within the LAPD. Chris retaliates by shining his own floodlights into Abel's bedroom. Lisa later reveals she is pregnant, creating conflict with Chris, who does not yet want children. Meanwhile, Abel is suspended without pay for abusing a suspect, inciting more fury within him.

Abel continues harassing the couple by hosting a loud bachelor party with his colleagues where he forces Chris to be sexually harassed by a stripper. Chris later plants trees along the fence between their properties, which leads to a near-violent exchange, as Abel objects to having trees hanging over his property. When Chris goes to a local bar, Abel enters and tells Chris that his own wife died in a traffic accident because she was having an affair with her white male employer, and that he mistrusts white men and is prejudiced against interracial relationships because of this. Abel sends his informant, Clarence Darlington, to trash the Mattson's home in another effort to force them out. Lisa arrives home early, surprising Clarence. They struggle and Lisa is knocked out, but not before she triggers the alarm. Chris races home, followed by a frustrated Abel. When Abel comes across his hired hoodlum trying to escape, he kills him in order to keep him quiet. Lisa is rushed to the hospital, but recovers.

Wildfires are raging in the surrounding hills and the residents are instructed to leave their homes. Abel, who remains behind, enters the Mattsons' home, hoping to retrieve Clarence's dropped cell phone, fearing that it will incriminate him. Lisa and Chris unexpectedly return from the hospital before Abel finds the phone, and he leaves. While the Mattsons pack to evacuate, Chris finds the cell phone. He calls the last number dialled and hears Abel answer. Chris realizes Abel is responsible for the break-in, and Abel realizes Chris has discovered the phone. Abel goes over with his gun drawn, and he and Chris struggle. Before Lisa can escape, Abel shoots her car, causing her to crash into a parked vehicle. After pistol-whipping Abel and supposedly knocking him unconscious, Chris tries to free Lisa from the car. Abel fires his gun at Chris but misses, and Chris holds Abel's other gun at him while telling him to stay back.

Hiding his gun in the back of his pants, Abel claims he is unarmed when county sheriff officers arrive on the scene. The police demand Chris drop his gun, while ordering Abel not move any further, uncertain of who the aggressor is. His wife begs him to comply and Abel tells him to listen to her. However, in an effort to expose Abel's true nature in front of the police, Chris retorts that Abel needed to have listened to his wife and sarcastically asks if he foresaw her betrayal, implying that his belligerent attitude drove her to cheat on him. A livid Abel pulls out his hidden handgun and shoots and injures Chris in the shoulder, after which he is promptly and viciously gunned down by his former colleagues. Chris survives the shooting, and in the ambulance, he and Lisa talk about their pride in their home, neighborhood, and soon-to-be family, while the wildfires finally seem to be contained.

Cast

Production

Real life inspiration
The plot was loosely based on real life events in Altadena, California involving an interracial couple, John and Mellaine Hamilton, and Irsie Henry, an African-American Los Angeles police officer. The saga was documented in a series of articles in both the Pasadena Star News and the Pasadena Weekly beginning in 2002.  Journalist Andre Coleman received a Los Angeles' Press Club Award for Excellence in Journalism for his series of articles in the Weekly.  Henry was eventually fired by the LAPD for his actions.

Filming 
The majority of the film was shot in Walnut, California on North Deer Creek Drive. The scene where Abel Turner comes out of the police station to talk to his partner and other police officers was filmed in Hawthorne, California on the corner of Grevillea Ave. & 126th St.

Reception

Critical response 
On Rotten Tomatoes, the film holds an approval rating of 44% based on 167 reviews, with an average rating of 5.50/10. The site's critical consensus reads, "This thriller about a menacing cop wreaking havoc on his neighbors is tense enough but threatens absurdity when it enters into excessive potboiler territory." On Metacritic, the film has an average weighted score of 47 out of 100, based on 28 critics, indicating "mixed or average reviews". Audiences polled by CinemaScore gave the film an average grade of "C+" on an A+ to F scale.

Roger Ebert of the Chicago Sun-Times gave the film a very positive review, awarding it his highest rating of four stars and saying: "Some will find it exciting. Some will find it an opportunity for an examination of conscience. Some will leave feeling vaguely uneasy. Some won't like it and will be absolutely sure why they don't, but their reasons will not agree. Some will hate elements that others can't even see. Some will only see a thriller. I find movies like this alive and provoking, and I'm exhilarated to have my thinking challenged at every step of the way."

Mick LaSalle of the San Francisco Chronicle also enjoyed the film, saying: "In its overall shape and message, Lakeview Terrace is a conventional suspense thriller, but the details kick it up a notch. ... The fun of Lakeview Terrace is not in what happens but in how it happens." J.R. Jones of the Chicago Reader called the film "one of the toughest racial dramas to come out of Hollywood since the fires died down – much tougher, for instance, than Paul Haggis's hand-wringing Oscar winner Crash."

Dennis Harvey of Variety said that Lakeview Terrace "delivers fairly tense and engrossing drama" but "succumb[s] to thriller convention." Anthony Lane of The New Yorker said that "the first hour of the film ... feels dangerous, necessary, and rife with comic disturbance," but added that "the later stages ... overheat and spill into silliness." James Berardinelli of ReelViews gave the film two stars out of four, saying that "the first two-thirds of Lakeview Terrace offer a little more subtlety and complexity than the seemingly straightforward premise would afford, but the climax is loud, dumb, generic, and over-the-top."

Wesley Morris of The Boston Globe said that "the movie might have something to say about black racism, but the conversations go nowhere, and the clichés of the genre take over." Sura Wood of The Hollywood Reporter said: "[The idea of] a black actor cast as the virulent bigot, with the object of his campaign of harassment the young interracial couple who move in next door, could be viewed as a novel twist. But the film, absent a sense of place and populated by repellent or weak characters, soon devolves into an increasingly foul litany of events." Joe Morgenstern of The Wall Street Journal gave it one half of a star out of five, and called the film a "joyless and airless suspense thriller."

Box office 
In its opening weekend the film grossed $15 million, placing it at number one in the United States. The film went on to gross $39.2 million in the United States and Canada, and $3.2 million in other territories, for a total of $42.4 million worldwide.

See also

 List of films featuring home invasions

References

External links
 
 
 

 Lakeview Terrace debuts in top spot at box office  CNN
 "Pasadena Weekly - Copping Out" 
 "Pasadena Weekly - Extremely Disturbing Behavior"

2008 films
2008 crime thriller films
2008 psychological thriller films
American crime thriller films
American psychological thriller films
2000s English-language films
Fictional portrayals of the Los Angeles Police Department
Films about interracial romance
Films about race and ethnicity
Films directed by Neil LaBute
Films produced by Will Smith
Films scored by Jeff Danna
Films scored by Mychael Danna
Films set in Los Angeles
Films with screenplays by David Loughery
Home invasions in film
Overbrook Entertainment films
American police detective films
Screen Gems films
Films about racism in the United States
2000s American films